Escape from the Sun is the debut album by the indie-rock band Operahouse. It was released in April 2009 through Marrakesh Records, available to buy in certain stores around the UK. The album was well received and gained a lot of good reviews from Q, The Sun and Clash Magazine, and strengthened the band's already quickly-growing fanbase. The band received a lot of advertising from Clash Magazine. They split soon after the album's release.

Track listing

Singles

References

2009 debut albums
Operahouse albums